William John Martin Hughes (born November 7, 1947) is a Canadian former professional ice hockey goaltender.

During the 1972–73 season Hughes played three games in the World Hockey Association with the Houston Aeros.

Awards and honours

References

External links

1947 births
Living people
Canadian ice hockey goaltenders
Fort Worth Texans players
Houston Aeros (WHA) players
Ice hockey people from Ontario
Muskegon Mohawks players
Sportspeople from Kirkland Lake